The 1989 Ürümqi unrest, also known as the 19 May riots in Ürümqi took place in the city of Ürümqi, capital of Xinjiang in China in May 1989, which began with Muslim protesters marched and finally escalated into violent attack against Xinjiang CPC office tower at People's Square on 19 May 1989.

The immediate cause was a book called Sexual Customs published in March 1989 which purported to describe the sexual life of Muslims and contained a number of controversial passages comparing Islamic architecture to various sexual features. This caused protests from Hui people in Gansu, Ningxia and Xinjiang. The protesters, mainly Uyghur and Hui, initially an conducted orderly march in the previous days and demanded for the government to destroy Sexual Customs and punish the two authors of the book (who used the pseudonyms "Ke Le" and "Sang Ya"), who were compared to Salman Rushdie in a reference to the controversy around The Satanic Verses. However, the protest ended up rioting, where nearly 2,000 rioters overthrew cars,  smashed windows and some attacked staff at CPC office. The government dispatched 1000 policemen and 1200 armed police soldiers to disperse the crowd and arrested 173.

The protests were not limited to Ürümqi. Muslims all across China organized protests in 1989. 3000 Muslims from all ten Muslim ethnicities marched in Beijing on 12 May. In April 20,000 Muslims demonstrated in Lanzhou & up to a 100,000 demonstrators came out in Xining. Smaller scale demonstrations took place in, Shanghai, Inner Mongolia, Wuhan, & Yunnan.  In response, the Chinese government banned the book, publicly burnt 95,000 copies of it in Lanzhou, and sentenced the authors to terms in jail.

References

See also
 July 2009 Ürümqi riots

History of Ürümqi
1989 riots
Protests in China
Riots and civil disorder in China
1989 in China
20th century in Xinjiang
Urumqi 1989